Dominik Märki  (born 9 October 1990) is a Swiss-American curler, currently living in Fayetteville, Arkansas. He currently plays third on Team Jason Smith.

He competed in the 2018 Winter Olympics, where he won a bronze medal as alternate for the Swiss team.

At his first United States National Championship in 2020, Märki skipped his team to a fourth place finish.

References

External links

1990 births
Living people
Swiss male curlers
Olympic curlers of Switzerland
Curlers at the 2018 Winter Olympics
Olympic bronze medalists for Switzerland
Medalists at the 2018 Winter Olympics
Olympic medalists in curling
Sportspeople from Bern
Sportspeople from Fayetteville, Arkansas
Swiss emigrants to the United States